Carlos López Hipólito (born 1956), better known as Carlos Hipólito, is a Spanish actor with a long stage career. He is perhaps most familiar to a television audience for performances in series such as Desaparecida, Guante blanco, Locked Up or Caronte, even though his most enduring television collaboration is his long-lasting voice work as old Carlos Alcántara in Cuéntame cómo pasó.

Biography 
Carlol López Hipólito was born in 1956 in Madrid. He started studies in architecture but he dropped off. A theater buff since childhood due to his mother's influence, he trained his acting chops at the William Layton lab. He started his acting career in stage plays, making his professional debut in 1978.

Hipólito has been a recurring face in José Luis Garci's feature films, including You're the One (2000), Story of a Kiss (2002), Tiovivo c. 1950 (2004), Ninette (2005), Sangre de mayo (2008) or Holmes & Watson. Madrid Days (2012). In 2003, he was nominated to the Goya Award for his supporting performance in Story of a Kiss.

Hipólito has performed the voiceover of Carlos Alcántara in Cuéntame cómo pasó since the beginning of the series in 2001. Many seasons after, he made an onscreen performance in Cuéntame's 21st season (released in 2021), when the timeline of the series made a leap-forward to COVID-19-struck Spain.

In 2020, he was awarded the Gold Medal of Merit in the Fine Arts.

Filmography 

Film

Television

Accolades

References 

1956 births
Spanish male film actors
Spanish male stage actors
Spanish male television actors
20th-century Spanish male actors
21st-century Spanish male actors
Living people